Download to Donate: Tsunami Relief (sometimes known as Download to Donate for Japan) is a compilation of songs by Music for Relief from different artists in which the proceeds went to Save the Children that helped the victims of the 2011 Tōhoku earthquake and tsunami. The third Download to Donate compilation album, it was launched on March 22, 2011 through Warner Bros. Records and Machine Shop Records. The songs were no longer available for download as of June 7, 2011.

Track listing

References

2011 compilation albums
Charity albums
Albums produced by Mike Shinoda
Songs about the 2011 Tōhoku earthquake and tsunami
Warner Records compilation albums